The Mitford Years is a series of fourteen novels by American writer Jan Karon, set in the fictional town of Mitford, North Carolina. The novels are Christian-themed, and center on the life of the rector, Father Tim.

Novels
 At Home in Mitford (1994)
 A Light in the Window (1995)
 These High, Green Hills (1996)
 Out to Canaan (1997)
 A New Song (1999)
 A Common Life: The Wedding Story (2001)
 In This Mountain (2002)
 Shepherds Abiding (2003)
 Light from Heaven (2005)
 Home to Holly Springs (2007)
 In the Company of Others (2010)
 Somewhere Safe with Somebody Good (2014)
 Come Rain or Come Shine  (2015)
 To Be Where You Are (2017)

References

Novels by Jan Karon